Dennis MacAlistair Ritchie (September 9, 1941 –  October 12, 2011) was an American computer scientist. He is most well known for creating the C programming language and, with long-time colleague Ken Thompson, the Unix operating system and B programming language. Ritchie and Thompson were awarded the Turing Award from the ACM in 1983, the Hamming Medal from the IEEE in 1990 and the National Medal of Technology from President Bill Clinton in 1999. Ritchie was the head of Lucent Technologies System Software Research Department when he retired in 2007. He was the "R" in K&R C, and commonly known by his username dmr.

Personal life and career 
Dennis Ritchie was born in Bronxville, New York. His father was Alistair E. Ritchie, a longtime Bell Labs scientist and co-author of The Design of Switching Circuits on switching circuit theory. As a child, Dennis moved with his family to Summit, New Jersey, where he graduated from Summit High School. He graduated from Harvard University with degrees in physics and applied mathematics.

In 1967, Ritchie began working at the Bell Labs Computing Sciences Research Center, and in 1968, he defended his PhD thesis on "Computational Complexity and Program Structure" at Harvard under the supervision of Patrick C. Fischer. However, Ritchie never officially received his PhD degree as he did not submit a bound copy of his dissertation to the Harvard library, a requirement for the degree. In 2020, the Computer History Museum worked with Ritchie's family and Fischer's family and found a copy of the lost dissertation. 

During the 1960s, Ritchie and Ken Thompson worked on the Multics operating system at Bell Labs. Thompson then found an old PDP-7 machine and developed his own application programs and operating system from scratch, aided by Ritchie and others. In 1970, Brian Kernighan suggested the name "Unix", a pun on the name "Multics". To supplement assembly language with a system-level programming language, Thompson created B. Later, B was replaced by C, created by Ritchie, who continued to contribute to the development of Unix and C for many years.

During the 1970s, Ritchie collaborated with James Reeds and Robert Morris on a ciphertext-only attack on the M-209 US cipher machine that could solve messages of at least 2000–2500 letters. Ritchie relates that, after discussions with the National Security Agency, the authors decided not to publish it, as they were told that the principle was applicable to machines still in use by foreign governments.

Ritchie was also involved with the development of the Plan 9 and Inferno operating systems, and the programming language Limbo.

As part of an AT&T restructuring in the mid-1990s, Ritchie was transferred to Lucent Technologies, where he retired in 2007 as head of System Software Research Department.

C and Unix 
Ritchie is best known as the creator of the C programming language, one of the developers of the Unix operating system, and co-author of the book The C Programming Language; he was the 'R' in K&R (a common reference to the book's authors Kernighan and Ritchie). Ritchie worked together with Ken Thompson, who is credited with writing the original version of Unix; one of Ritchie's most important contributions to Unix was its porting to different machines and platforms. They were so influential on Research Unix that Doug McIlroy later wrote, "The names of Ritchie and Thompson may safely be assumed to be attached to almost everything not otherwise attributed."

Ritchie liked to emphasize that he was just one member of a group. He suggested that many of the improvements he introduced simply "looked like a good thing to do", and that anyone else in the same place at the same time might have done the same thing.

Nowadays, the C language is widely used in application, operating system, and embedded system development, and its influence is seen in most modern programming languages. C is a low level language with constructs closely translating to the hardware's instruction set. However, it is not tied to any particular hardware—making it easy to write programs on any machine that supports C. Moreover, C is a high level language with constructs mapping to the application's data structures.

C influenced several other languages and derivatives as C++, Objective-C used by Apple, C# used by Microsoft, and Java extensively used in corporate environment and also by Android. Ritchie and Thompson used C to write UNIX. Unix has been influential establishing computing concepts and principles that have been widely adopted.

In an interview from 1999, Ritchie clarified that he saw Linux and BSD operating systems as a continuation of the basis of the Unix operating system, and as derivatives of Unix:

In the same interview, he stated that he viewed both Unix and Linux as "the continuation of ideas that were started by Ken and me and many others, many years ago."

Awards 
In 1983, Ritchie and Thompson received the Turing Award "for their development of generic operating systems theory and specifically for the implementation of the UNIX operating system". Ritchie's Turing Award lecture was titled "Reflections on Software Research". In 1990, both Ritchie and Thompson received the IEEE Richard W. Hamming Medal from the Institute of Electrical and Electronics Engineers (IEEE), "for the origination of the UNIX operating system and the C programming language".

In 1997, both Ritchie and Thompson were made Fellows of the Computer History Museum, "for co-creation of the UNIX operating system, and for development of the C programming language."

On April 21, 1999, Thompson and Ritchie jointly received the National Medal of Technology of 1998 from President Bill Clinton for co-inventing the UNIX operating system and the C programming language which, according to the citation for the medal, "led to enormous advances in computer hardware, software, and networking systems and stimulated growth of an entire industry, thereby enhancing American leadership in the Information Age".

In 2005, the Industrial Research Institute awarded Ritchie its Achievement Award in recognition of his contribution to science and technology, and to society generally, with his development of the Unix operating system.

In 2011, Ritchie, along with Thompson, was awarded the Japan Prize for Information and Communications for his work in the development of the Unix operating system.

Death

Ritchie was found dead on October 12, 2011, at the age of 70 at his home in Berkeley Heights, New Jersey, where he lived alone. First news of his death came from his former colleague, Rob Pike. He had been in frail health for several years following treatment for prostate cancer and heart disease. News of Ritchie's death was largely overshadowed by the media coverage of the death of Apple co-founder Steve Jobs, which occurred the week before.

Legacy
Following Ritchie's death, computer historian Paul E. Ceruzzi stated:

In an interview shortly after Ritchie's death, long time colleague Brian Kernighan said Ritchie never expected C to be so significant.
Kernighan told The New York Times "The tools that Dennis built—and their direct descendants—run pretty much everything today." Kernighan reminded readers of how important a role C and Unix had played in the development of later high-profile projects, such as the iPhone. Other testimonials to his influence followed.

Reflecting upon his death, a commentator compared the relative importance of Steve Jobs and Ritchie, concluding that "[Ritchie's] work played a key role in spawning the technological revolution of the last forty years—including technology on which Apple went on to build its fortune." Another commentator said, "Ritchie, on the other hand, invented and co-invented two key software technologies which make up the DNA of effectively every single computer software product we use directly or even indirectly in the modern age. It sounds like a wild claim, but it really is true." Another said, "many in computer science and related fields knew of Ritchie’s importance to the growth and development of, well, everything to do with computing,..."

The Fedora 16 Linux distribution, which was released about a month after he died, was dedicated to his memory. FreeBSD 9.0, released January 12, 2012, was also dedicated in his memory.

Asteroid 294727 Dennisritchie, discovered by astronomers Tom Glinos and David H. Levy in 2008, was named in his memory. The official  was published by the Minor Planet Center on 7 February 2012.

Gallery

Notable works 
 B programming language
 C programming language on which many currently used languages and technologies are based.
 Unix, a multiuser operating system. Several workalikes (commonly referred to as Unix-like systems) have been developed based on Unix's design. Some of these follow POSIX standards, again based on Unix.
 Unix Programmer's Manual (1971)
 The C Programming Language (sometimes referred to as K&R; 1978 with Brian Kernighan)

Publications and academic papers 
Ritchie has been the author or contributor to about 50 academic papers, books and textbooks and which have had over 15,000 citations.

Here are some of his most cited works:

 The C programming language, BW Kernighan, DM Ritchie, Prentice Hall, Englewood Cliffs, New Jersey (1978)
 Programming languages, D Ritchie (1978) 
The UNIX time-sharing system, DM Ritchie, K Thompson, Classic operating systems, 195-220 (2001)
Advanced programming in the UNIX environment, WR Stevens, SA Rago, DM Ritchie, Addison-Wesley (1992, 2008)

See also
 List of pioneers in computer science

References

External links

 Dennis Ritchie's home page at Bell Labs
 "The C Family of Languages: Interview with Dennis Ritchie, Bjarne Stroustrup, and James Gosling" – article in Java Report, 5(7), July 2000 and C++ Report, 12(7), July/August 2000
 
 Dennis Ritchie's video interview June 2011
 
 

1941 births
2011 deaths
American computer scientists
American technology writers
Harvard School of Engineering and Applied Sciences alumni
Turing Award laureates
Multics people
Unix people
Plan 9 people
Inferno (operating system) people
C (programming language)
Scientists at Bell Labs
National Medal of Technology recipients
Programming language designers
People from Bronxville, New York
People from Berkeley Heights, New Jersey
People from Summit, New Jersey
Summit High School (New Jersey) alumni
20th-century American inventors
Scientists from New York (state)